Conrad Rochat (10 July 1927 – 24 May 2014) was a Swiss ski jumper. He competed in the individual event at the 1956 Winter Olympics.

References

External links
 

1927 births
2014 deaths
Swiss male ski jumpers
Olympic ski jumpers of Switzerland
Ski jumpers at the 1956 Winter Olympics
Place of birth missing